Perry Township is one of the sixteen townships of Brown County, Ohio, United States. The 2010 census found 4,735 people in the township, 4,405 of whom lived in the unincorporated portions of the township.

Geography
Located in the far northern part of the county, it borders the following townships:
Marion Township, Clinton County - north, west of Jefferson Township
Jefferson Township, Clinton County - north, east of Marion Township
Dodson Township, Highland County - east, north of Salem Township
Salem Township, Highland County - east, south of Dodson Township
Green Township - south, east of Sterling Township
Sterling Township - south, west of Green Township
Jackson Township, Clermont County - west, south of Wayne Township
Wayne Township, Clermont County - west, north of Jackson Township

The most northerly township in Brown County, it is the only part of the county to border Clinton County.

The village of Fayetteville is located in central Perry Townships, and the census-designated places of St. Martin and Lake Lorelei lie in the township's northeast and west.

Name and history
Perry Township was formed in 1815.

It is one of twenty-six Perry Townships statewide.

Government
The township is governed by a three-member board of trustees, who are elected in November of odd-numbered years to a four-year term beginning on the following January 1. Two are elected in the year after the presidential election and one is elected in the year before it. There is also an elected township fiscal officer, who serves a four-year term beginning on April 1 of the year after the election, which is held in November of the year before the presidential election. Vacancies in the fiscal officership or on the board of trustees are filled by the remaining trustees.

References

External links
County website

Townships in Brown County, Ohio
Townships in Ohio
1815 establishments in Ohio
Populated places established in 1815